Eleоnora Valerieva Kezhova (born 28 December 1985 in Sofia) is a retired Bulgarian rhythmic gymnast. She is a two-time member of the Bulgarian rhythmic gymnastics team at the World Championships, and contributed to a silver medal in the group all-around in 2003. The following year, at the 2004 Summer Olympics in Athens, Kezhova helped her squad claim a bronze medal in the same program.

Career

2000–2003
Kezhova made her official worldwide debut, as a 15-year-old teen, at the 2000 Summer Olympics in Sydney, where she placed seventh for the Bulgarian squad in the group all-around tournament with a composite score of 38.432 (19.166 for five clubs and 19.266 for two hoops and three ribbons).

At the 2002 World Rhythmic Gymnastics Championships in New Orleans, Louisiana, United States, Kezhova and her Bulgarian team finished fourth in the same program with a score in 47.050, missing out the medal podium by 350-thousandths of a point.

The following year, at the 2003 World Rhythmic Gymnastics Championships in Budapest, Hungary, Kezhova pulled off the second highest score both in ribbons and in hoops and clubs to hand the Bulgarians a silver medal in the group all-around tournament (a score of 50.175), and a qualifying ticket to her second Olympics.

2004 Summer Olympics

At the 2004 Summer Olympics in Athens, Kezhova Zhaneta Ilieva, Zornitsa Marinova, Kristina Rangelova, and twin sisters Galina and Vladislava Tancheva in the competition, Kezhova performed a double routine using five ribbons (23.400) and a combination of three hoops and two balls (25.200) to deliver the Bulgarian squad a bronze-medal score in 48.600.

See also

 List of Olympic medalists in gymnastics (women)

References

External links
 

1985 births
Living people
Bulgarian rhythmic gymnasts
Gymnasts at the 2000 Summer Olympics
Gymnasts at the 2004 Summer Olympics
Medalists at the 2004 Summer Olympics
Olympic gymnasts of Bulgaria
Olympic bronze medalists for Bulgaria
Olympic medalists in gymnastics
Gymnasts from Sofia
Medalists at the Rhythmic Gymnastics World Championships